Oleg Aleksandrovich Yerofeyev (10 July 1940 – 24 December 2022) was an officer of the Soviet and Russian Navies, who reached the rank of admiral, and commanded the Northern Fleet from 1992 to 1999.

Honours and awards
 Order of Lenin
 Order of the October Revolution
 Order of Military Merit

References

1940 births
2022 deaths
Military Academy of the General Staff of the Armed Forces of the Soviet Union alumni
Burials in Troyekurovskoye Cemetery
Recipients of the Order of Lenin
Recipients of the Order of Military Merit (Russia)
Soviet Navy personnel
People from Petropavlovsk-Kamchatsky
Russian admirals
N. G. Kuznetsov Naval Academy alumni